A. Rahman Khan (1942-1943 – August 20, 2020) was born in Cumbum, Theni District (previously Madurai District). He was an Indian politician representing the DMK (Dravida Munnetra Kazhagam) party. He was the Minister for Labour and later, Minister for Revenue in the Government of Tamil Nadu.

He also served two terms as Vice Chairman for National Small Savings Scheme.

He contested 8 times for  Member of the Legislative Assembly. He was elected to the Tamil Nadu legislative assembly as a Dravida Munnetra Kazhagam (DMK) candidate from Chepauk constituency in the 1977, 1980 and 1984 elections. He was elected as a DMK candidate from Park Town constituency in 1989 and from Ramanathapuram constituency in 1996.
He died on 20/08/2020 at Chennai.

References 

Dravida Munnetra Kazhagam politicians
State cabinet ministers of Tamil Nadu
2020 deaths
People from Idukki district
Tamil Nadu MLAs 1985–1989
Tamil Nadu MLAs 1996–2001
Year of birth missing